Guttula is a genus of sea snails, marine gastropod mollusks in the family Seguenziidae.

Description
(Original description by Schepman) The small, shell has a conoidal shape. It is smooth, pearly, and perforate. The aperture is rounded, with an angle at the base. The operculum contains few whorls.

It is chiefly on account of the peculiar radula, that Schepman had located the then only species in a new genus.

Quin (1998) adds the following specifications.

Shell: The shell has no peripheral carina, no axial riblets, no midwhorl angulation, no spiral lirae, no basal, posterior or anterolateral sinus, no columellar sinus. The aperture has a circular shape. The columellar tooth is absent. There is no umbilical septum. The shell has punctate microsculpture.

Radula: the rachidian tooth is broader than high and has the lateral wings prominent. The lateral tooth cusp is broad to absent.

Species
Species within the genus Guttula include:
Guttula blanda Barnard, 1963
Guttula galatheae Knudsen, 1964
Guttula sibogae Schepman, 1908

References

External links
 Quinn J. F. (1983). A revision of the Seguenziacea Verrill, 1884. I. Summary and evaluation of the superfamily. Proceedings of the Biological Society of Washington 96 (4): 725-757

 
Seguenziidae